Doris Schwaiger (born 28 February 1985) is a retired female beach volleyball player from Austria.

She is the sister of Stefanie Schwaiger, and they play together in international beach volleyball. The sisters first appeared together at the 2002 FIVB U19 Beach Volleyball World Championships in Xylokastro and then made their World Tour debuts the following year at the Klagenfurt Grand Slam. Their best ever finish on the FIVB Beach Volleyball World Tour was second at the 2013 Shanghai Grand Slam.

The sisters represented Austria at the 2008 Summer Olympics in Beijing, China and the 2012 Summer Olympics in London.  They reached the quarterfinals both times.

On 30 May 2014 Doris Schwaiger announced her retirement from beach volleyball.

References

External links
 Doris Schwaiger at the Beach Volleyball Database
 The Schwaiger teams's Website

1985 births
Living people
Austrian beach volleyball players
Women's beach volleyball players
Beach volleyball players at the 2008 Summer Olympics
Beach volleyball players at the 2012 Summer Olympics
Olympic beach volleyball players of Austria
Sportspeople from Vienna